Pierina Ana Sanchez (born June 10, 1988) is an American politician from the Bronx, New York City. Since 2022, Sanchez has represented the 14th district on the New York City Council, encompassing Kingsbridge, Fordham, University Heights, and Tremont. A Democrat, Sanchez formerly served in the mayoral office of Bill de Blasio as a policy advisor.

Early life and education 
Sanchez was born in University Heights and grew up in the Kingsbridge neighborhood of the Bronx. She is the daughter of Mixed-race Dominican immigrants who immigrated to the United States in the 1970s.

After enrolling in the Upward Bound college-preparatory program provided by Bronx Community College, Sanchez attended Harvard University on a full scholarship. She later received a Master's in Public Affairs (M.P.A.) degree from Princeton University's School of Public and International Affairs.

Career 
While at Harvard, Sanchez worked for an immigration non-profit organization and tutored incarcerated GED students. After receiving her undergraduate degree, she worked in constituency services for councilman Fernando Cabrera. While at Princeton, Sanchez interned at the White House in the summer of 2012 during the presidency of Barack Obama.

In 2015, Sanchez was elected to serve on the board of the Bronx Young Democrats. She also worked under Mayor of New York Bill de Blasio as senior advisor for housing, economic development and labor.

New York City Council 
In the 2021 New York City Council election, Sanchez ran to replace Cabrera, her former boss. Sanchez's campaign received the support of the Retail, Wholesale and Department Store Union (RWDSU) and the New York City Central Labor Council.

As a candidate, Sanchez advocated for universal after-school programs for college preparation and vocational training, and endorsed the creation of more worker cooperatives. On housing, Sanchez endorsed the creation of a right to counsel, rent cancellation, and direct funding for repairing New York City Housing Authority (NYCHA) units. Sanchez endorsed the defund the police movement in 2020.

In the final count, Sanchez received 62.4 percent of the vote in the Democratic primary against runner-up Yudelka Tapia, who received 37.6 percent. Sanchez won the general election against Republican opponent Shemeen Chappell. On the City Council, Sanchez currently serves as chair of the housing and buildings committee.

References 

21st-century American politicians
21st-century American women politicians
American politicians of Dominican Republic descent
Candidates in the 2021 United States elections
Harvard University alumni
Hispanic and Latino American New York City Council members
Hispanic and Latino American women in politics
Living people
New York (state) Democrats
New York City Council members
Politicians from the Bronx
Princeton University alumni
Princeton School of Public and International Affairs alumni
1988 births